Life's Aquarium is the fourth studio album by American R&B group Mint Condition. The album was released on November 16, 1999, and it is their first album released for Elektra Records.

Background
Life's Aquarium is their first studio recording after their departure from Perspective Records, the record company that produced their three previous albums. They made their debut as Elektra artists on the soundtrack to the motion picture Why Do Fools Fall in Love with the song "Love is for Fools".  They were originally signed to Elektra subsidiary East West Records, but were later moved to Elektra proper for the release of Life's Aquarium.

Released in November 1999, the album was originally scheduled for release in October of that year. The month-long pushback was due to the label's wait for the reception to the album's first single "If You Love Me". The song originally appeared as a solo track by Stokley Williams on the soundtrack to the 1998 Jada Pinkett Smith film Woo.  The song was re-recorded with the band and a featured a string section that was arranged and composed by conductor Clare Fischer.  The music video was directed by Bille Woodruff.  "If You Love Me" peaked at number 30 on the Billboard Hot 100 and 5 on the Hot R&B/Hip-Hop Singles & Tracks. A second single was released- "Is This Pain Our Pleasure" and peaked at number 42 on the Hot R&B/Hip-Hop Singles & Tracks chart. The low charting of the song was due primarily to a music video never being made for the song.

Upon release, Life's Aquarium charted at number 64 on the Billboard 200 and number 7 on the R&B albums charts. To date, it is the lowest selling Mint Condition album released on a major label. Life's Aquarium is notable for being their last album as a sextet. One year after its release, keyboardist Keri Lewis would leave the band – reducing the band to a quintet. It is also notable for being their last album released on a major label – as they went independent for their subsequent releases.

Track listing

 Note
 The hidden tracks "DeCuervo's Revenge" and "If We Play Cards" appear at the end of the song "Leave Me Alone".

Personnel
Credits adapted from liner notes.

 Stokley Williams - lead and background vocals,  bass synth, drums, keyboards, guitar, bass
 Keri Lewis - piano, keyboards, guitar, drum programming, moog keyboard, background vocals 
 O'Dell - drum programming, keyboards, guitar, background vocals
 Lawrence El - keyboards, fender rhodes, accordion, background vocals
 Jeffrey Allen - saxophone, fender rhodes, keyboards, background vocals  
 Ricky Kinchen - bass, background vocals
 Chris "Daddy" Dave - drums
 Dei Dei Dionne, Esther Godinez - additional vocals
 Clare Fischer - string arrangement
 Prince Charles Alexander - record engineering
 Jeff “Madjef” Taylor - record engineering
 Xavier Smith - record engineering
 Tony Maserati - mixing
 Steve Hodge - mixing
 Prince Charles Alexander - mixing
 Jeff “Madjef” Taylor - mixing
 Warren Riker - mixing
 Herb Powers - mastering
 Scott Schafer - photography
 Ricky Kinchen - photography
 Jim deBarros - design

Charts

Weekly charts

Year-end charts

References

Further reading
Billboard article
Billboard review
Allmusic review

1999 albums
Elektra Records albums
Mint Condition (band) albums